Kehoe, originally spelled MacKehoe (from Irish  'son of Eochaidh', a personal name based on  'horse'), is an Irish surname that stems from several distinct septs in Ireland.

The most notable branch were from southeastern Ireland in the province of Leinster and are descended from Brandub mac Echach, King of Leinster, in the 6th century AD. This branch were the Chief Filí of Leinster up until the 17th century and inaugurated the Kings of Leinster upon their stone called Leac Mhic Eochadha ("Eochaidh's flagstone").

Another unrelated and separate branch, descends from King Domnall Mór Ua Cellaigh of the O'Kellys of Uí Maine, who died in 1221.

Many of their descendants have emigrated to America and have spread throughout that part of the world. The name is spelled in a variety of ways, however the most common are Kehoe, Keogh and Keough. In Ireland the Kehoe version is used most often in and around County Wexford while Keogh is more common throughout the rest of the country.

People named Kehoe
 Alice Beck Kehoe (born 1934), American anthropologist
 Andrew Kehoe (1872–1927), American mass murderer and school bomber
 Bob Kehoe (1928–2017), American footballer
 Brendan Kehoe (1970–2011), Author and software developer
 Brian Kehoe (born 1982), American male fashion model
 Chevie Kehoe (born 1973), American white supremacist convicted of 3 murders and other violent felonies
 Christine Kehoe (born 1950), politician from California
 Frank Kehoe, American diver and water polo player
 Harry Kehoe (born 1990), Irish hurler
 Jack Kehoe (1934–2020), American actor
 James J. Kehoe (1863–1909), New York state senator 1905–1906
 James Nicholas Kehoe (1862–1945), American politician
 James W. Kehoe (1925–1998), American lawyer and judge
 Jen Kehoe (born 1983), British skier and army officer
 Jim Kehoe (1918–2010), American university administrator
 John Kehoe (disambiguation)
 Justin Kehoe (born 1980), Irish professional golfer
 Kevin Kehoe (hurler) (born 1991), Irish hurler
 L. Paul Kehoe (born 1938), New York politician and judge
 Michael Kehoe (1899–1977), 16th president of the Gaelic Athletic Association
 Nicholas Kehoe (born 1943), U.S. Air Force lieutenant general
 Patrick Kehoe, Irish politician
 Paudie Kehoe (born 1990), Irish hurler
 Paul Kehoe (born 1973), Irish politician
 Robert A. Kehoe (1893–1992), toxicologist and apologist for the use of lead as an additive in gasoline
 Richie Kehoe (born 1986), Irish hurler
 Rick Kehoe (born 1951), Canadian hockey player
 Sally Kehoe (born 1986), Australian rower
 Tim Kehoe (1970–2014), American author and inventor
 Timothy Kehoe (born 1953), American macroeconomist
 Walter Kehoe (1870–1938), US Congressman from Florida

See also
Keogh (surname)
Keoghan (surname)
Keohane (disambiguation)
Keough (surname)
McKeogh
McKeough (disambiguation)

Surnames of Irish origin